Phon Na Kaeo is a district (amphoe) of Sakon Nakhon province, northeast Thailand.

History
The minor district (king amphoe) was created on 1 April 1991, when the four tambons Ban Phon, Na Kaeo, Na Tong Watthana, and Ban Paen were split off from Mueang Sakon Nakhon district. It was upgraded to a full district on 5 December 1996.

Geography
Neighboring districts are (from the south clockwise) Khok Si Suphan, Mueang Sakon Nakhon and Kusuman of Sakon Nakhon Province, Pla Pak, Huai Phueng and Wang Yang of Nakhon Phanom province.

Administration
The district is divided into five sub-districts (tambons), which are further subdivided into 48 villages (mubans). There are no municipal (thesaban) areas, and a further five tambon administrative organizations.

References

External links
amphoe.com (Thai)

Phon Na Kaeo